Kolayır (also, Kolair) is a village and municipality in the Samukh Rayon of Azerbaijan.  It has a population of 2,978.

References 

Populated places in Samukh District